Philip Cook or Philip Cooke may refer to:

Philip St. George Cooke (1809–1895), U.S. Army cavalry officer
Philip Pendleton Cooke (1816–1850), American lawyer and minor poet from Virginia
Philip Cook (general) (1817–1894), general in the army of the Confederate States of America and U.S. Representative from Georgia
Philip Cooke (judge) (1893–1956), New Zealand lawyer and judge
Philip J. Cook (born 1946), American sociologist and criminologist
Philip W. Cook, American journalist
Phil Cooke  (born 1954), American writer, television producer and media consultant
Philip Cook (bishop) (1875–1938), Episcopal bishop of Delaware
Hal Cook (Philip Halford Cook; 1912–1990), Australian public servant
Phil Cook (musician), American musician and member of Megafaun